Patton Design, Inc. is an industrial design, engineering, software and hardware, and prototyping consultancy based in Irvine, California. The firm was founded in 1983 by California State University at Long Beach alumnus Doug Patton.

Company staff appeared on the ABC television series American Inventor and represented the million dollar winner with the "Anecia Survival Capsule" child safety seat, the second place winner with "The WordAce" children's game, and the third place winner with "The Catch Elite" football receiver trainer.

Patton Design is a patron member of the Industrial Designers Society of America and has won seventeen Industrial Design Excellence Awards.

References

External links

Design companies established in 1983
Companies based in Irvine, California
Computer hardware companies
Software companies based in California
Industrial design firms
1983 establishments in California
Software companies of the United States